Bakon may refer to:
Bacon vodka
Bakon, Iran (disambiguation)